Daniele Baselli (born 12 March 1992) is an Italian professional footballer who plays as a midfielder for Serie B club Como. He has also appeared for the Italy national team, earning one cap in 2018.

Club career

Early career

Baselli was born in Brescia and joined Atalanta's youth system in 2000, aged 8. In the 2010–11 season he was promoted to the club's Primavera, for which he appeared in 22 league matches and scored five goals. He also collected some appearances on the bench for the first team both in Serie B and Coppa Italia.

Cittadella
On 13 July 2011 he was sold to Serie B club Cittadella in a co-ownership deal for a nominal fee of €500, for which he made his debut in a 1–2 loss in Coppa Italia to Fiorentina. He made his debut in the league on 27 August, starting in a 2–1 home success against AlbinoLeffe. He finished the 2011–12 season with 13 appearances in the league, including 10 as a starter.

After the renewal of the co-ownership between the two clubs he remained in Veneto the following season, during which he took part in two matches of Coppa Italia and 37 in the league, even scoring his professional goal on 18 May 2013, netting the winner in a home win over Ascoli.

Return to Atalanta
On 20 June 2013 he returned to Atalanta, after the Bergamo side bought the other half of the player's rights for €803,500, with Cittadella offering a reported €50,000 less. He signed a four-year deal with Atalanta, and made his debut for the club on 18 August, playing the last 17 minutes and assisting Giuseppe De Luca in the last goal of a 3–0 home win over Bari.

On 1 September Baselli made his Serie A debut, coming on as a second-half substitute in a 2–0 home success over Torino; he was handed his first start in the main category of Italian football thirteen days later, in a 0–2 loss against Napoli. He scored his first goal in Serie A on 10 May 2015 in Palermo, scoring the 1–0 against the Rosaneri.

Torino
On 10 July 2015, he was sold to Torino, in the same transfer that also brought Davide Zappacosta to Piedmont, for a total of €10.3 million. Baselli made his competitive debut for Torino on 17 August in the third round of Coppa Italia against Pescara, scoring Torino's first goal in a 4–1 win. On 23 August, he scored his first goal in Serie A with Torino in a 2–1 win away to Frosinone. He concluded the 2014–15 season with 35 appearances and four goals.

On 20 August 2016, he scored his first goal of the 2016–17 season in a 3–2 loss against Milan at the San Siro. He concluded the season with 37 appearances and six goals. On 12 July 2017, he renewed his contract with Torino until 2022.

Baselli continued to play as a starter for Torino in the 2017–18 season, first under the manager Siniša Mihajlović, and later under Walter Mazzarri. On 6 May 2018, he captained Torino for the first time during a 2–2 draw at the Stadio San Paolo against Napoli. He concluded his third season with Torino making 32 appearances and scoring 4 goals, earning his first call-up to the Italy national football team.

On 25 July 2019, in his fifth season for Torino , he makes his UEFA club competition debut in the Europa League first qualifying round against Debreceni VSC (3-0). He played for Torino for another 2 and a half seasons, struggling to find playing time due to multiple injuries and technical choices.

Cagliari
On 28 January 2022, he was sold outright to Cagliari.

Como
On 9 August 2022, Baselli joined Como on a free transfer.

International career
In 2009, he played two friendly matches with the Italy under-18. On 24 September 2009 he made his debut with the under-19 in the match won 3–0 against Turkey.

On 13 November 2012 he made his debut with the under-21, in the friendly match won 1–0 against Spain. He was called up by Devis Mangia for a friendly won the following 6 February against Germany, but did not play. On 14 August 2013 he played as a starter in the friendly match won by the Azzurri 4–1 against Slovakia. On 5 September 2013, he played as a starter under Luigi Di Biagio in the match against Belgium, valid for the 2015 UEFA European Under-21 Championship qualifiers.

From 10 to 12 March 2014, he was called up to the senior national team by coach Cesare Prandelli as part of an internship to evaluate young players ahead of the 2014 FIFA World Cup, confirmed on the next meeting between 14 and 15 April. He took part in the 2015 UEFA European Under-21 Championship in the Czech Republic.

Baselli earned his first senior cap in an 8–0 drubbing of San Marino in an unofficial friendly match on 31 May 2017, for Italy national football B team. He started the game and played 45 minutes, before being replaced by fellow debutant Lorenzo Pellegrini.

On 19 May 2018 Baselli was called up to the Italy senior national team by coach Roberto Mancini for the team's friendlies against Saudi Arabia, France and the Netherlands. He made his official debut for the Italy senior side on 4 June, in a 1–1 friendly draw against the Netherlands in Turin, coming on as a second-half substitute for Jorginho.

Style of play
According to his agent Giuseppe Riso: "His role is certainly as a central midfielder, not in front of the defence. Over time he will be able to play as a metodista however right now his movement is quite dangerous when he makes runs into the opposing area. He is a 'box to box midfielder'". An elegant, technically gifted, and complete midfielder, Baselli is a clean tackler and a competent passer with both feet; due to his attributes, he is capable of winning balls, scoring goals, or creating chances for his team.

Career statistics

Club
Updated 28 January 2023.

International

Honours

Club
Atalanta
Torneo Città di Arco (2): 2008, 2009
Campionato Berretti: 2008–09

References

External links
 FIGC international stats  
 
 

1992 births
Living people
Footballers from Brescia
Italian footballers
Italy international footballers
Italy youth international footballers
Italy under-21 international footballers
Association football midfielders
Serie A players
Serie B players
Atalanta B.C. players
A.S. Cittadella players
Torino F.C. players
Cagliari Calcio players
Como 1907 players